Jacqueline Danno (27 November 1931 – 28 November 2021) was a French actress and singer.
Danno died on 28 November 2021, one day after turning 90.

References

1931 births
2021 deaths
Actresses from Le Havre
French women singers